LGBT rights in Korea may refer to:
LGBT rights in North Korea
LGBT rights in South Korea